Ștefan Balmez (born 1882 in Chișinău) was a Bessarabian Bulgarian politician.

Biography
Before World War I, although working as Armaments Minister, Balmez was in the civil service. He served as Member of Sfatul Țării (the Parliament of Bessarabia) in 1917–1918. He was one of three deputies who voted against the accession of Bessarabia to Romania on 27 March 1918. After the Soviet occupation of Bessarabia and Northern Bukovina in June 1940, Balamez was arrested on 28 June 1941 by the NKVD. Due to the outbreak of hostilities on the Eastern Front, he was evacuated to the executive labor camp Ivdel in Siberia, where he was sentenced to 10 years on the count of participation in counter-revolutionary activity. His subsequent destiny is unknown. Balamez was rehabilitated by the Moldavian SSR Prosecutor's Office on 10 May 1989, in accordance with the Decree of the Presidium of the Supreme Soviet of the USSR of 16 January 1989.

Bibliography 
Gheorghe E. Cojocaru, Sfatul Țării: itinerar, Civitas, Chișinău, 1998, 
Mihai Tașcă, Sfatul Țării și actualele autorități locale, Timpul de dimineață, no. 114 (849), June 27, 2008 (page 16)

External links 
 Arhiva pentru Sfatul Țării
 Deputații Sfatului Țării și Lavrenti Beria

Notes

1882 births
Bessarabian Bulgarians
Year of death missing
Moldovan MPs 1917–1918
Romanian people imprisoned abroad